Zdeněk Růžička (15 April 1925 – 18 April 2021) was a Czech gymnast who was a three-time Olympian. Winning two individual bronze medals on floor exercise and rings at the Gymnastics at the 1948 Summer Olympics  where he also placed 7th in the combined individual all-around standings, he continued to compete at the next two Olympiads where his best results were top-15 placements on pommel horse and rings in 1952 and a top-10 finish on the horizontal bar in 1956. He was born in Ivančice. He died 18 April 2021 at the age of 96.

References

1925 births
2021 deaths
Czech male artistic gymnasts
Gymnasts at the 1948 Summer Olympics
Gymnasts at the 1952 Summer Olympics
Gymnasts at the 1956 Summer Olympics
Medalists at the 1948 Summer Olympics
Olympic bronze medalists for Czechoslovakia
Olympic gymnasts of Czechoslovakia
Olympic medalists in gymnastics
People from Ivančice
Sportspeople from the South Moravian Region